Baltasar Guedes de Sousa was the 7th Captain-major of Portuguese Ceylon. Sousa was appointed in 1560 under Sebastian of Portugal, he was Captain-major until 1564. He was succeeded by Pedro de Ataíde Inferno.

References

Captain-majors of Ceilão
16th-century Portuguese people